Ove Kjell Berg (born 27 May 1944) is a retired Swedish middle-distance runner. He competed in the 1500 m event at the 1968 Summer Olympics, but failed to reach the final. Berg won the national 800 m title in 1968 and 1969.

References

1944 births
Living people
Swedish male middle-distance runners
Olympic athletes of Sweden
Athletes (track and field) at the 1968 Summer Olympics